The Wenghorn is a mountain of the Swiss Pennine Alps, overlooking Simplon in the canton of Valais. It lies at the eastern end of the range east of the Fletschhorn.

References

External links
 Wenghorn on Hikr

Mountains of the Alps
Mountains of Valais
Mountains of Switzerland
Two-thousanders of Switzerland